Giunti may refer to:

People
 Federico Giunti (born 1971), Italian former footballer
 Ignazio Giunti (1941–1971), Italian racing driver.
 Lucantonio Giunti or Giunta (1457–1538), Florentine book publisher and printer
 Massimo Giunti (born 1974), former Italian cyclist

Other
 Giunti (printers), an Italian family of printers active from the 15th to the 17th century
 Giunti Editore, an Italian publisher founded 1956